Engineering, procurement, and construction (EPC) contracts (a type of turnkey contract) are a form of contract used to undertake construction works by the private sector on large-scale and complex infrastructure projects.

Overview
Under an EPC contract, a contractor is obliged to deliver a complete facility to a developer who needs only "turn a key" to start operating the facility; hence EPC contracts are sometimes called turnkey construction contracts. In addition to delivering a complete facility, the contractor must deliver that facility for a guaranteed price by a fixed date and it must perform to the specified level. Failure to comply with any requirement will usually result in the contractor incurring monetary liabilities. The EPC contractor coordinates all design, procurement and construction work and ensures that the whole project is completed as required and in time. They may or may not undertake actual site work.

Various abbreviations used for this type of contract are LSTK for lump sum turn key, EPIC for engineering, procurement, installation & commissioning and EPCC for engineering, procurement, construction and commissioning. Use of EPIC is common, e.g., by FIDIC and most Persian Gulf countries. Use of LSTK is common in the Kingdom of Saudi Arabia. Use of EPCC is common in Qatar and some other countries.

EPC functions
EPC contracts cover the following issues.

Engineering functions
 Basic engineering
 Detailed engineering
 Planning
 Construction engineering
Procurement functions
 Logistics and transport
 Receiving
 Procurement
 Invoicing
 Purchasing

Construction functions
 Electrical installation
 Mechanical erection
 Civil engineering
Commissioning functions
 After-sales-service
 Testing and commissioning
 Modernization of plants

An EPC, LSTK, or EPCC all are the same types of contracts. This form of contract is covered by the FIDIC (International Federation of Consulting Engineers) Silver Book  containing the title words EPC/turnkey. The initials EPCM are also encountered frequently on international projects, but this is very different from EPC. EPCM is a services-only contract, under which the contractor performs engineering, procurement and construction management services. In an EPCM arrangement, the client selects a contractor who provides management services for the whole project on behalf of the client.

See also
EPCI
Construction management

References

Bibliography

Civil engineering
Engineering economics
Facilities engineering
Costs
Project management techniques
Construction documents